Sydney Max Falstein (30 May 1914 – 18 May 1967) was an Australian politician.

Early life

Falstein was born on 30 May 1914 at Coffs Harbour to Russian grazier Abram Max Falstein and German-born Rosa, née Goldman. He attended Sydney Boys' High (1926–27) and Sydney Grammar schools, and later studied for a Bachelor of Arts and a law degree at the University of Sydney. On 13 March 1937 he married nurse Ila Brenda Greig at Darlinghurst, and was thus estranged from his Jewish mother. He spent several years in New Zealand before returning to Australia; he was admitted to the New South Wales Bar in 1940.

Federal politics

Falstein was first involved in politics in New Zealand, where he was an organiser for the New Zealand Labour Party. In Australia, he was elected to the Australian House of Representatives in 1940 for the seat of Watson, representing the Australian Labor Party. In parliament he became associated with Arthur Calwell and others who opposed John Curtin's leadership. After Curtin became Prime Minister, Falstein openly clashed with him over issues concerning the Royal Australian Air Force in 1944.

Falstein had enlisted in the RAAF on 18 July 1942; he was convicted of using insubordinate language to a superior in September of that year and was sentenced to twenty-eight days detention. He qualified as a pilot and completed an operational tour from 1944 to 1945 in the south-west Pacific.

After the war Falstein became involved in business. He was convicted of falsifying documents to understate imported wristwatches' value in 1948 and fined. Consequently, the ALP did not endorse him for Watson in the 1949 election. On 22 October 1949, Falstein announced that he had resigned from the ALP and would re-contest Watson as an independent. He was unsuccessful. His only further political acts were to support Menzies' Communist Party dissolution attempt; a marked anti-communist, he had nevertheless supported the recognition of Communist China.

Later life

Falstein was declared bankrupt on 12 August 1958; his appeals to the courts failed. He returned to the bar in 1961. In his final years he suffered from hypertension and diabetes, and he died on 18 May 1967 of cerebral thrombosis at Concord. He was survived by his wife, a daughter, and three of his four sons.

References

1914 births
1967 deaths
Australian Labor Party members of the Parliament of Australia
Members of the Australian House of Representatives
Members of the Australian House of Representatives for Watson
Deaths from cerebral thrombosis
Independent members of the Parliament of Australia
20th-century Australian politicians
Australian people of Russian descent
Australian people of German descent
Royal Australian Air Force personnel of World War II
Australian World War II pilots